The Greenstream pipeline, part of the Western Libyan Gas Project, is a natural gas submarine pipeline running from western Libya to the island of Sicily in Italy.

History
The idea of natural gas from Libya to Italy originating from the 1970s. Feasibility studies were carried out in the 1980s and 1990s. Construction of the pipeline started in 2003. The pipeline's main contractor was Saipem, that used for pipeline laying the Castoro Sei and Crawler vessels. The shore approach and landfall works were done by Boskalis Offshore.

The supplies started on 1 October 2004 and the pipeline was inaugurated on 7 October 2004 by Silvio Berlusconi and Muammar Gaddafi.

Technical features
It is located in water depths exceeding . It includes also the Mellitah compressor station and the Gela reception terminal. The pipeline is supplied from the Bahr Essalam offshore field, Bouri Field and Wafa field near Algerian border,  from Mellitah. The construction cost US$6.6 billion. Later the capacity was increased to 11 bcm.

Ownership
The pipeline is constructed and owned by Agip Gas BV, a joint venture of the Italian energy company Eni and the National Oil Corporation (NOC) of Libya.

See also

Trans-Mediterranean Pipeline
GALSI
Medgaz
Maghreb–Europe Gas Pipeline
Trans-Saharan gas pipeline

References

External links

Energy infrastructure completed in 2004
Natural gas pipelines in Libya
Natural gas pipelines in Italy
Tripolitania
Italy–Libya relations
Pipelines under the Mediterranean Sea
2004 establishments in Italy
2004 establishments in Libya